Medousa (- Memkovo) is a settlement in the Xanthi regional unit of Greece. It is part of the Thermes community.

References

Sources
Michail, Domna. Migration, tradition and transition among the Pomaks in Xanthi (Western Thrace). Department of Balkan Studies Aristotle University of Thessaloniki. LSE PhD Symposium on Social Science Research on Greece Hellenic Observatory, European Institute, LSE. June 21, 2003.

Populated places in Xanthi (regional unit)